Kerry Lynn Gibson is a South African-New Zealand clinical psychologist and academic, specialising in youth mental health. She is currently the Deputy Head of School (Academic) for the School of Psychology at the University of Auckland. Gibson was the president of the New Zealand Psychological Society, from 2014 until 2016.

Academic career

In the early 2000s, Gibson was the senior lecturer in psychology at the University of Cape Town. She co-authored several textbooks with South African psychologist Leslie Swartz applying psychodynamics to issues in organisational psychology.  In the mid-2000s, Gibson was one of the academics commissioned to assess the psychological effects experienced by members of the Centrepoint Commune after its closure. Since 2007, Gibson has served as the director for the Massey University Auckland Campus Centre for Psychology. In 2010,Gibson co-authored a study with Claire Cartwright and John Read that investigated if long-term use of antidepressants was potentially addictive. Also in 2010, Gibson joined the psychology faculty of the University of Auckland. 

In September 2021, Gibson published the book What Young People Want from Mental Health Services, focusing on challenges experienced by youth in their late teens and early 20s. This book is based on the Mirror Project, a qualitative study involving over 400 interviews of New Zealand youth.

Selected works

Bibliography

References

External links
 
 

Living people
Year of birth missing (living people)
New Zealand women academics
Academic staff of the University of Auckland
New Zealand psychologists
New Zealand women psychologists
South African women academics
South African psychologists
South African women psychologists
University of Cape Town alumni
Academic staff of the University of Cape Town
Psychology educators
Academic staff of the Massey University